The Breadwinner is a 2017 adult animated drama film from Irish animation studio Cartoon Saloon directed by Nora Twomey. Based on the best-selling novel by Deborah Ellis, the film was an international co-production between Canada, the Republic of Ireland and Luxembourg, and received a limited release on 17 November 2017.

The film had its world premiere at the 2017 Toronto International Film Festival in September. The Breadwinner received a nomination for Best Animated Feature at the 90th Academy Awards, but lost to Coco.

Plot
Parvana is an 11-year-old girl who lives in Kabul under the Taliban's Islamic Emirate of Afghanistan (1996–2001). Her father, Nurullah, is a former school teacher who became a hawker after losing his left leg in the Soviet–Afghan War. One day, during supper, he is unjustly arrested after a volatile young Taliban thug, Idrees, thinks he insulted him earlier while the two were selling goods in the market. Because the Taliban forbids women from going out without a male relative, Parvana's family is left without the means to support themselves, as her elder brother Sulayman died years ago, leaving her, her mother Fattema, her elder sister Soraya, and her youngest infant brother Zaki. When Parvana and her mother try to go to the prison to appeal Nurullah's arrest, a thug beats Fattema and threatens to arrest them if they go outside again. Parvana comforts Zaki by telling the story of a boy on a quest to retrieve his village's seeds from the evil Elephant King.

Later, Parvana tries to buy food for her family, but the hawkers cannot sell her any due to fear of the Taliban. To support her family, she decides to cut her hair and dress as a boy, "Aatish", claiming to be Nurullah's nephew. The plot works, and Parvana is able to get both food and money. On the advice of Shauzia, another young girl disguised as a boy, Parvana tries to bribe a prison guard so she can see her father. However, the guard sends her away. She works to save up more money for a larger bribe, taking on hard labor jobs with Shauzia, who is trying to save enough money to escape her abusive father. Meanwhile, Fattema is forced to write to a relative in Mazar, arranging marriage for Soraya in exchange for shelter and protection. Parvana also meets Razaq, the former patrol partner of Idrees; the illiterate Razaq pays her to read him a letter informing him that his wife was killed by a land mine. He befriends her and continues to meet with her so that she can teach him how to read and write.

Parvana and Shauzia take a hard labor job where Idrees was also present. He recognises her, and, after being hit abruptly by Parvana with a brick, tries to kill her as she flees with Shauzia. Parvana and Shauzia manage to hide, and Idrees is abruptly called away to fight in war, never to be seen again. When Parvana returns home, Fattema pleads with her to stop the dangerous plot, telling her that her relatives accepted Soraya and that they will be collected the day after next. Parvana agrees on the condition that she gets to visit Nurullah in prison to tell him where they are going, as Razaq has a cousin who works there that will let her in. She tearfully bids farewell to Shauzia, promising that they will meet 20 years from then. However, as Parvana travels to the prison, Fattema's cousin arrives early and forces them to come with him without Parvana, as the war is starting and the roads will soon be blocked. Fattema eventually stands up to her cousin in a furious manner, refusing to let him take them further, and he leaves the family stranded on the road.

Parvana arrives at the prison, where she finds Razaq. After Parvana reveals that she is Nurullah's daughter, Razaq informs her that his cousin has left to fight, but he will retrieve Nurullah. As the prison is being cleared out of weak prisoners who are unable to fight, Parvana witnesses their execution. Terrified, she gathers her courage to stay by finishing the tale of the boy, who she turns into Sulayman, revealing that he died after picking up a "toy" on the street, which was actually a land mine that exploded. Razaq is shot on the shoulder while rescuing the weak Nurullah, but the wound was not fatal and he reunites the father and daughter. Parvana takes her father away, where they will soon reunite with the rest of the family and escape from Afghanistan together, as the two continue the story they were telling each other at the start of the film.

Voice cast
Saara Chaudry as Parvana / Aatish
Soma Bhatia as Shauzia / Deliwar
Ali Badshah as Nurullah
Noorin Gulamgaus as Idrees and Sulayman
Kane Mahon as Kiln Owner
Laara Sadiq as Fattema
Shaista Latif as Soraya
Kanza Feris as Sorceress / Woman in Courtyard 
Kawa Ada as Razaq
Ali Kazmi as Darya / Fruit Juice Vendor / Jail Warden
Mran Volkhard as Mega Phone / Market Seller
Reza Sholeh as Stall Seller / Fruit Seller / Guard Man On Bike / Teenage Boy #2

Production

In May 2016, it was announced that key animation for the film had commenced. The Breadwinner was a co-production between Aircraft Pictures in Canada, Melusine Productions in Luxembourg, and Cartoon Saloon in Ireland.

The Breadwinner was executive produced by Angelina Jolie who worked with director Nora Twomey to bring the novel to the screen. Twomey is an Irish animator, director, screenwriter, producer and voice actress. She is also a founding partner in Cartoon Saloon, an Irish animation studio based in Kilkenny that did the key animation for The Breadwinner. Twomey commented on the serious theme in her animation film, saying "I think that animation is very broad... so I don't see why it needs to be thought of as just a babysitting device... I wanted to go for the same audience that Deborah had gone for — young adults and adults as well. The film doesn't really talk down to anyone."

In a 2018 interview with Twomey, she revealed that Angelina Jolie was involved in the casting of the voice actors, in particular the Canadian talent Saara Chaudry who voices Parvana, as Twomey recalls "She [Chaudry] has such empathy, intellect and emotional depth, a unique talent for an 11 year old actor." Choudry's personality also played a role in shaping Parvana's mannerisms, as Twomey explains in another interview, “Seeing what Saara was able to comprehend as an actor, as an artist, and as a child gave me an understanding of how to craft our film [in a way] that doesn't take for granted what children are afraid of or not afraid of.”

Twomey also explained that Jolie's insight as UN Goodwill ambassador at Afghani girls' schools was helpful in making the film, as she reportedly offered advice on the intricacies of Afghani behavior and the cultural atmosphere of Afghanistan. Mimi Polk Gitlin, producer of the feminist classic Thelma and Louise, was also involved as an executive producer.

Twomey also explained that she was careful to cast voice actors of Afghani heritage and to work with an Afghani dialect coach. She says, “there was so much input from people there at the time, to make sure it was not judgemental but also empathetic”. The Kabul-born dialect coach, Kawa Abu, also voices the character of Razaq. According to Twomey, the story-within-a-story about the mythical Elephant king was inspired by Guillermo Del Toro's Pan's Labyrinth.  The texture and depth of the vivid fairy-tale fable and distinctive cut-out look was created using Nuke compositing software, from the Toronto-based Guru Studio.

During the development of the screenplay, screenwriter Anita Doron worked together with the American-Afghan artist Aman Mojadidi, to balance an Afghani perspective with a global perspective to capture the universal tone of the film. The first draft of the screenplay also saw contributions from the Afghan Women's Organization, as various Afghani refugees from different regions and tribes offered their perspectives and deepened the film's understanding of the Afghani culture.

School children along with their parents were invited for an early screening of the film, as Twomey noted that parents became emotional and teary whereas children, taking note from Parvana, were cheerful and chatty.

Music
The film's music is composed by the brothers Mychael and Jeff Danna. Its palette of timbres sways between the austere, to underscore the real life sequences, and the more colorful to illustrate the parallel fantasy story. Performers include a young girls choir whose participation was arranged through the Afghanistan National Institute of Music.

Reception

Box office
The film earned $17,395 its opening weekend in North America.

, The Breadwinner has grossed $313,381 in the United States and Canada, and $2,954,368 internationally for a worldwide total of $3,266,749.

Critical response
On review aggregation website Rotten Tomatoes, the film has an approval rating of 95% based on 105 reviews, with an average rating of 7.90/10. The website's critical consensus reads, "The Breadwinners stunning visuals are matched by a story that dares to confront sobering real-life issues with uncommon—and richly rewarding—honesty." On Metacritic, which assigns a normalized rating to reviews, the film has a score of 78 out of 100 based on reviews from 20 critics, indicating "generally favorable reviews".

Kenneth Turan of the Los Angeles Times gave the film a positive review, writing "...'The Breadwinner' reminds us yet again that the best of animation takes us anywhere at any time and makes us believe." Mark Kermode, writing for The Guardian, gave the film 5/5 stars, writing "Along with the eerie beauty of the animation there is a salving streak of humour that softens this tale's sharper edges, reminding us that – for children – laughter and bravery walk hand in hand." The review also compares the defiant feminist spirit of The Breadwinner to that of the 2007 French-Iranian animation film Persepolis. Furthermore, the music by Mychael and Jeff Danna is described as "lyrical and expressive", for evoking elements of Eastern culture and the enchanted story world. The director, Nora Twomey, is praised as the "real heroine of the story" for her directorial debut.

The New York Times selected The Breadwinner as its NYT Critic's pick and further praising Twomey for her "nuanced way with characterization and action". The voice cast, in particular Saara Chaudry who voices Parvana, was described as "terrific".

Varietys Peter Debruge compares Parvana's vivid emerald eyes to those of the Afghan girl on the June 1985 cover of National Geographic, explaining that both characters' eyes challenge viewers with their defiance and how "her [Parvana's] spirit burns every bit as strongly". Though the storyline is criticized for its rushed ending, the review praises its palette and musical score, and also recognizes The Breadwinner as "nothing short of exceptional, celebrating as it does a young woman who faces adversity head-on and who relies on her own creativity, both as a storyteller and in practical situations, to adapt to whatever obstacles she faces."

Vanessa H. Larson of The Washington Post gave the film three and a half out of four stars, praising the animation, for the realistic portrayal of characters as well as cultural setting of Kabul, while criticizing the story for being difficult to follow at times.

The deputy country director of Canadian Women for Women in Afghanistan, Abdul Rahim Ahmad Parwani, says "After the movie was over and the lights were turned back on, I saw tears in the eyes of many Afghans. I couldn't stop my own tears," as he explains that many Afghans connected strongly with The Breadwinner. Another Afghani activist, Mina Sharifi, who is the director of Sisters4Sisters - a mentorship program for Afghan girls, also expresses her appreciation for the film's eye for detail, as she says, "the clothing, the food, the family atmosphere, even the cane that the grandfather carried was carved and looked just like it was from here, I haven't seen another film on Afghanistan that takes the time to do that."

Accolades
The film has received ten Annie Award nominations, winning Best Independent Animated Feature and lost all nominations to Coco, making it the most nominations for an adult animated film ever at the awards.

See also
Osama, a 2003 film with a similar premise.
Persepolis
The Breadwinner (novel)

References

External links

2017 animated films
2017 LGBT-related films
2017 films
LGBT-related animated films
Animated films based on children's books
Cross-dressing in film
Annie Award winners
Canadian animated feature films
Canadian LGBT-related films
Films based on Canadian novels
Films scored by Jeff Danna
Films scored by Mychael Danna
Films set in 2001
Films set in Afghanistan
Irish animated films
Irish LGBT-related films
Irish independent films
English-language Irish films
English-language Canadian films
English-language Luxembourgian films
Luxembourgian animated films
Luxembourgian LGBT-related films
Canadian adult animated films
Cartoon Saloon films
Irish Film Board films
2010s English-language films
2010s Canadian films
Animated drama films